Chester is a city in northern Hancock County, West Virginia, United States, along the Ohio River. The population was 2,214 at the 2020 census.  Located immediately south of Ohio and just west of  Pennsylvania, Chester is the northernmost city in West Virginia. It is a part of the Weirton–Steubenville metropolitan area, and is home to the World's Largest Teapot.

History

Chester was established in 1896, but not incorporated until 1907. The town was established by East Liverpool, Ohio lawyer J.E. McDonald, and the name may be a transfer from Chester County, Pennsylvania or Chester, England, although its true origin is unknown. It was the home of Rock Springs Park, a small amusement park founded in 1897 by McDonald, home to various rides, a swimming pool, a lake, a small zoo, and live performances. It closed in 1970 for the expansion of U.S. Route 30 through the area. 

The town grew in the early 20th century, led primarily by the pottery industry founded in nearby East Liverpool. The Taylor, Smith & Taylor Company was the leading manufacturer in Chester, employing over 800 people at one time. Another large employer was the steel manufacturing Chester Rolling Mill Company. The Chester teapot, the town's main attraction, was purchased by Wilford Devon in 1938 and moved to Chester from Carnegie, Pennsylvania. It served as a barrel-shaped food stand with soft serve ice cream, hot dogs, and soft drinks until it was moved and remodeled to its current location in 1990 and has been featured in depictions of West Virginia, such as in the video game Fallout 76.

Geography
Chester is located at  (40.612792, -80.562771).  At the outbreak of hostilities of the Civil War in April 1861, this location was part of Virginia and was the northernmost point in any slave state. Chester remains the northernmost point in the Southern United States, as defined by the United States Census Bureau.

The following highways pass through Chester: 
  U.S. Route 30
  West Virginia Route 2

Demographics

2010 census
As of the census of 2010, there were 2,585 people, 1,209 households, and 696 families living in the city. The racial makeup of the city was 98.0% White, 0.4% African American, 0.3% Asian, 0.6% from other races, and 0.6% from two or more races. Hispanic or Latino of any race were 1.4% of the population.

There were 1,209 households, of which 26.5% had children under the age of 18 living with them, 40.4% were married couples living together, 12.1% had a female householder with no husband present, 5.0% had a male householder with no wife present, and 42.4% were non-families. 38.3% of all households were made up of individuals, and 19.1% had someone living alone who was 65 years of age or older. The average household size was 2.14 and the average family size was 2.81.

The median age in the city was 43.2 years. 21.9% of residents were under the age of 18; 6.2% were between the ages of 18 and 24; 23.9% were from 25 to 44; 27.7% were from 45 to 64; and 20.2% were 65 years of age or older. The gender makeup of the city was 46.7% male and 53.3% female.

2000 census
As of the census of 2000, there were 2,592 people, 1,160 households, and 725 families living in the city. The population density was 2,705.1 people per square mile (1,042.5/km2). There were 1,289 housing units at an average density of 1,345.2 per square mile (518.4/km2). The racial makeup of the city was 98.77% White, 0.15% African American, 0.23% Asian, 0.31% from other races, and 0.54% from two or more races. Hispanic or Latino of any race were 1.12% of the population.

There were 1,160 households, out of which 25.8% had children under the age of 18 living with them, 46.4% were married couples living together, 11.5% had a female householder with no husband present, and 37.5% were non-families. 33.8% of all households were made up of individuals, and 16.8% had someone living alone who was 65 years of age or older. The average household size was 2.23 and the average family size was 2.85.

In the city, the population was spread out, with 22.0% under the age of 18, 8.0% from 18 to 24, 27.2% from 25 to 44, 23.1% from 45 to 64, and 19.8% who were 65 years of age or older. The median age was 40 years. For every 100 females, there were 88.0 males. For every 100 females age 18 and over, there were 87.0 males.

The median income for a household in the city was $28,550, and the median income for a family was $37,672. Males had a median income of $30,625 versus $18,724 for females. The per capita income for the city was $17,137. About 8.1% of families and 10.8% of the population were below the poverty line, including 11.3% of those under age 18 and 11.6% of those age 65 or over.

Education
Children in Chester are served by the Hancock County School District. The current schools serving Chester are:
 Allen T. Allison Elementary School – grades K-4
 Oak Glen Middle School – grades 5-8
 Oak Glen High School – grades 9-12

Notable people
 Dale Baird, American thoroughbred horse racing trainer, 15 time U.S. Champion Thoroughbred Trainer by wins
 Herb Coleman, American football center
 Daniel Johnston, significant outsider and Lo-fi music singer and songwriter, artist
 Jim Jordan, basketball player
 Win Mercer, Major League Baseball pitcher
 Scott Paulsen, radio personality, former host of The DVE Morning Show and columnist
 Randy Swartzmiller, member of the West Virginia House of Delegates from the 1st district

See also
 List of cities and towns along the Ohio River
 Jennings Randolph Bridge
 Rock Springs Park

References

External links
 City website

Cities in Hancock County, West Virginia
West Virginia populated places on the Ohio River
Cities in West Virginia